KLVK may refer to:
 
 The ICAO code for Livermore Municipal Airport, in Livermore, California, United States
 KLVK (FM), a radio station (89.1 FM) licensed to Fountain Hills, Arizona, United States